Lesbian, gay, bisexual, and transgender (LGBT) people in the U.S. state of Florida may face legal challenges not experienced by non-LGBT residents. Same-sex sexual activity became legal in the state after the U.S. Supreme Court's decision in Lawrence v. Texas on June 26, 2003, and same-sex marriage has been legal in the state since January 6, 2015. Discrimination on account of sexual orientation and gender identity in employment, housing and public accommodations is outlawed following the U.S. Supreme Court's ruling in Bostock v. Clayton County. In addition, several cities and counties, comprising about 55 percent of Florida's population, have enacted anti-discrimination ordinances. These include Jacksonville, Miami, Tampa, Orlando, St. Petersburg, Tallahassee and West Palm Beach, among others. Conversion therapy is also banned in a number of cities in the state, mainly in Palm Beach County and the Miami metropolitan area.

Legality of same-sex sexual activity
After Florida became a territory of the United States in 1821, the Territorial Legislature enacted laws against fornication, adultery, bigamy, and incest, as well as against "open lewdness, or... any notorious act of public indecency, tending to debauch the morals of society." Florida's first specific sodomy law, which was enacted in 1868 and made sodomy a felony, read: "Whoever commits the abominable and detestable crime against nature, either with mankind or with beast, shall be punished by imprisonment in the state prison not exceeding twenty years." In 1917, the Florida Legislature added a lesser crime, a second-degree misdemeanor: "Whoever commits any unnatural and lascivious act with another person shall be punished by fine not exceeding five hundred dollars, or by imprisonment not exceeding six months."

Florida courts interpreted the 1868 law to prohibit all sexual activity between two men or two women. It also prohibited oral sex and anal sex  between heterosexual partners. In 1971, the Florida Supreme Court, ruling in Franklin v. State, struck down the "crime against nature" statute as unconstitutionally vague. The court retained the state's prohibition on sodomy by ruling that anal and oral sex could still be prosecuted under the lesser charge of "lewd and lascivious" conduct. Florida further enacted a "psychopathic offender law" in 1955, under which those convicted of sodomy (labelled as "criminal sexual psychopathic persons") would be periodically examined to determine if they had "improved to a degree that [they] will not be a menace to others". The law was repealed in 1979.

In 1960, the state Attorney General issued an opinion that Florida's sodomy statute did not apply to Indian reservations. The opinion stated that crimes committed between Native Americans or between Native Americans and non-Native Americans were a matter for tribal courts. This meant that if the particular reservation had no law against it, sodomy would be legal on the reservation. However, sodomy between non-Native Americans on the reservation would fall under the jurisdiction of state law and would be liable to prosecution.

Same-sex sexual activity remained illegal in Florida until 2003, when the United States Supreme Court struck down all state sodomy laws in Lawrence v. Texas. As of 2020, the state's sodomy law, though unenforceable, has not been repealed by the Florida Legislature.

In October 2018, during a gay sex undercover sting operation by Florida law enforcement, a judge ruled that gay sex is not illegal in a public space so long as it is within a room.

In September 2020, Hillsborough County officials arrested 11 men on misdemeanor charges. Each of the 11 men had gone to a local park and struck up a conversation with another man with both eventually agreeing to having consensual sex. They were arrested on misdemeanor charges that do not involve sex crimes. The Hillsborough County Sheriff's Office published the names and mugshots of all 11 men to local news outlets. Critics accused the Sheriff's Office of deliberately targeting gay men, asking if undercover deputies would have also arrested a man and a woman for meeting in public and agreeing to have sex.

Recognition of same-sex relationships

The state enacted legislation banning same-sex marriage in 1977. Since the passage of Florida Amendment 2 in November 2008 by a vote of 61.9 percent in favor and 38.1 percent opposed, both same-sex marriage and civil unions have been banned by the Florida Constitution.

Amendment 2 added Article I Section 27 to the Florida Constitution, which says:

A U.S. district court ruled on August 21, 2014, in Brenner v. Scott, that Florida's same-sex marriage ban was in violation of the Constitution of the United States. As a result of that ruling, same-sex marriage has been legal in the state since the court's temporary injunction took effect on January 6, 2015. Judge Robert Lewis Hinkle wrote:

Nine counties, thirty cities, and one town in Florida offer domestic partnership benefits to same-sex couples.

In March 2016, a bill passed the Florida House of Representatives by a vote of 112–5 and the Senate by a vote of 38–0 to repeal a 1868 ban on cohabitation between unmarried couples. Governor Rick Scott signed the bill into law on April 6, 2016, and it went into effect on July 1, 2016.

Adoption and parenting
In 1977, partly due to the anti-gay Save Our Children campaign led by Anita Bryant in Miami, the Florida Legislature passed a law specifically prohibiting homosexuals from adopting children; the statute survived several court challenges, and was upheld by the Eleventh Circuit Court of Appeals in 2004 in Lofton v. Secretary of the Department of Children and Family Services.

In 2010, in the case of In re: Gill, involving a same-sex couple raising two foster children whom they wanted to adopt, a state appeals court upheld the ruling by a lower court that the law violated equal protection rights of the couple and the children under the Florida Constitution. The Governor and Attorney General declined to appeal the ruling further, ending Florida's 33-year-old ban on same-sex adoptions. 

The Florida Legislature undertook comprehensive adoption reform in 2015. The legislation repealed the 1977 ban on homosexual adoption. It passed the Florida House of Representatives on a 68–50 vote on March 11. On April 15, the Florida Senate passed the bill on a 27–11 vote. Republican Governor Rick Scott signed the bill into law on June 11, and it went into effect on July 1, 2015.

Lesbian couples have access to in vitro fertilization. State law recognizes the non-genetic, non-gestational mother as a legal parent to a child born via donor insemination, but only if the parents are married. The Florida Department of Health began automatically recognizing the non-biological mother as a legal parent on May 5, 2016. The move came after three same-sex couples filed a federal lawsuit against the state in July 2015 over its practice of treating married same-sex couples differently to married opposite-sex couples; the non-biological father is automatically recognized as a legal parent, but previously this was not the case for the non-biological mother. Additionally, gay male couples are permitted to undertake gestational and traditional surrogacy arrangements under the same terms and conditions as different-sex couples.

Discrimination protections

Since 2000, and amended in 2007, nursing homes and hospitals cannot discriminate on the basis of sexual orientation, but gender identity is not addressed. Florida statutes do not address discrimination based on gender identity or sexual orientation in employment, housing or other areas.

The counties of Alachua, Broward, Duval, Hillsborough, Leon, Miami-Dade, Monroe, Orange, Osceola, Palm Beach, Pinellas, and Volusia, and the cities and towns of Atlantic Beach, Boynton Beach, Delray Beach, Dunedin, Fernandina Beach, Fort Lauderdale, Gainesville, Greenacres, Gulfport, Haverhill, Jacksonville, Juno Beach, Key West, Lake Clarke Shores, Lake Park, Lake Worth Beach, Largo, Leesburg, Mascotte, Miami, Miami Beach, Mount Dora, North Palm Beach, North Port, Oakland Park, Ocean Ridge, Orlando, Pembroke Pines, Riviera Beach, Sarasota, St. Petersburg, Tallahassee, Tampa, Tequesta, Venice, Wellington, West Palm Beach, Westlake, and Wilton Manors prohibit discrimination in private and public employment, housing and public accommodations on account of sexual orientation and gender identity. St. Augustine Beach has similar protections, but for employment and housing only.

Sarasota County, Cape Coral, Neptune Beach, and Port St. Lucie prohibit discrimination in employment on the basis of sexual orientation and gender identity in the public sector only, i.e. against county or city employees only. Likewise, Montverde prohibits public sector-discrimination but on the basis of sexual orientation only.

The Florida Competitive Workforce Act would ban LGBT discrimination in employment, housing and public accommodations statewide. First introduced in 2009, it received its first public hearing in 2016. It stalled in a 6–6 vote amid disputes over the inclusion of gender identity protections and restrooms. The bill is bipartisan and supported by a number of business groups.

In January 2019, the Florida Department of Agriculture and Consumer Services added sexual orientation and gender identity to their discrimination workplace policy.

Glenn v. Brumby

In December 2011, the United States Court of Appeals for the Eleventh Circuit (which covers Alabama, Florida and Georgia) ruled that Vandy Beth Glenn, a transgender woman living in Georgia, had been unfairly terminated from her job at the Georgia Legislative Assembly due to her transgender status. Relying on Price Waterhouse v. Hopkins and other Title VII precedent, the court concluded that the plaintiff was discriminated against based on her sex because she was transitioning from male to female. The court stated that a person is considered transgender "precisely because of the perception that his or her behavior transgresses gender stereotypes." As a result, there is "congruence" between discriminating against transgender individuals and discrimination on the basis of "gender-based behavioral norms." "Because everyone is protected against discrimination based on sex stereotypes, such protections cannot be denied to transgender individuals", the court ruled. The court held that employment discrimination based on transgender status is tantamount to discrimination on the basis of sex, as defined by the Civil Rights Act of 1964.

Bostock v. Clayton County

On June 15, 2020, the U.S. Supreme Court ruled in Bostock v. Clayton County, consolidated with Altitude Express, Inc. v. Zarda, and R.G. & G.R. Harris Funeral Homes Inc. v. Equal Employment Opportunity Commission that discrimination in the workplace on the basis of sexual orientation or gender identity is discrimination on the basis of sex, and Title VII therefore protects LGBT employees from discrimination.

LGBT advocacy groups in Florida hailed the decision, urging the state to pass legislation extending discrimination protections to housing, credit, health care and public accommodations.

In February 2021, the Florida Commission on Human Relations, the state's civil rights enforcement agency, announced it will enforce the Bostock ruling. The agency announced it will investigate claims of discrimination in employment, housing and public accommodations. The Human Rights Campaign hailed the decision:

Hate crime law
Florida's hate crime law provides harsher legal penalties for crimes committed based on the victim(s)' sexual orientation, but not gender identity.

Transgender rights

Identity documents 
Transgender people in Florida are allowed to change their legal gender on official documents, including birth certificates, driver's licenses and state IDs. The Bureau of Vital Statistics will issue an amended birth certificate with a corrected gender marker upon receipt of an "Application to Amend a Florida Birth Record", an "Affidavit of Amendment of Certificate of Live Birth" signed in front of a notary, a letter from a physician confirming "appropriate clinical treatment for gender transition", and the payment of the amendment fee. "Appropriate clinical treatment for gender transition" does not include the need to undergo sex reassignment surgery or sterilization. The Department of Highway Services and Motor Vehicles previously required evidence of sex reassignment surgery in order to change the gender marker on a Florida ID and driver's license. In 2011, the Department changed its requirements. In order to update a name and/or gender on a Florida ID or driver's license, the applicant must submit a court order for a name change and/or a signed original statement on office letterhead from the attending physician stating that the applicant is undergoing "appropriate clinical treatment for gender transition".

In January 2022, it was reported that for the first time within Florida's history a birth certificate has "sex-unknown" listed for an individual, instead of either just male or female.

Public bathrooms 
In August 2020, the U.S. Eleventh Circuit Court of Appeals ruled that a high school in Ponte Vedra Beach violated the law by refusing to allow transgender student Andrew Adams to use the restroom consistent with his gender identity. In October 2022, the Florida Education Board unanimously approved new guidelines and rules regarding how transgender people can use school bathrooms. In January 2023, the United States Court of Appeals for the Eleventh Circuit formally upheld the ban on transgender individuals within bathrooms in Florida.

Athletics
On June 1, 2021, Governor of Florida Ron DeSantis signed a bill excluding transgender girls and women (which the bill defines as "students of the male sex", based on sex assigned at birth) from participating in sports designated for female students. The bill had been passed by the Florida House of Representatives on April 14, then was shelved in the Florida Senate on April 20; on April 28, the Florida Legislature passed a "revived last minute bill" with last-minute legislative "procedural maneuvers". A lawsuit is pending in both state and federal courts into the transgender sports ban within Florida, immediately right after the Governor's signature into law on June 1. The Human Rights Campaign kicked off the campaign to try and stop the law from going into effect (called "nullification") on midnight July 1.

In early 2023, the Florida High School Athletics Association recommended that all female athletes be mandated to supply up to date information on their menstrual cycles to a database accessible by their school's administrators. This was speculated by many to be a method of both enforcing abortion restrictions, and detecting any female athletes who might be trans women in violation of the state's ban.

Healthcare

Youth 
As a result of legislation that took effect on March 16, 2023, minors are not able to receive any gender-affirming healthcare in Florida, even to participate in clinical trials. The rule was approved on November 4, 2022 by the Florida Board of Medicine (all 14 of whom were appointed to the position by Governor DeSantis, and eight of whom had contributed financially to DeSantis' election campaign) and the state Board of Osteopathic Medicine.

The guidelines suggested transgender youth under 18 should not be treated with puberty blockers, hormone therapy, or gender confirming surgeries (though surgery was already generally not provided to minors), excluding treatment for intersex minors. His memo further stated that social transition "should not be a treatment option for children or adolescents." This contradicted the global medical consensus as reflected in the WPATH Standards of Care. Most major medical organizations, including the U.S Department of Health and Human Services (HHS), and international bodies such as The Endocrine Society, opposed the Florida's proposal.

Ladapo's subsequent press release stated:"The federal government's medical establishment releasing guidance failing at the most basic level of academic rigor shows that this was never about health care, it was about injecting political ideology into the health of our children. Children experiencing gender dysphoria should be supported by family and seek counseling, not pushed into an irreversible decision before they reach 18", citing a study which claimed to have found high rates of desistance among transgender youth, which has been widely criticized by the psychiatric community for using "a large cohort of children who did not actually meet the criteria for gender dysphoria, meaning they were not transgender".Other scientists cited in Ladapo's memo said their studies were willfully misrepresented and that their original data instead showed that "hormone blockers and hormone replacement therapy could help alleviate gender dysphoria and make transgender youth feel more at home in their own bodies". Ladapo's guidelines were also heavily criticized by organizations such as GLAAD, The Trevor Project, the Human Rights Campaign, and the ACLU. The LGBT media advocacy organization GLAAD argued that the memo was "playing politics with [transgender children's] lives", stating that "All major medical associations support gender-affirming care for trans youth. Denying kids live-saving, medically necessary, gender-affirming care is downright dangerous." The HHS agency's Office for Civil Rights pledged to defend anyone who was denied medical treatment because of gender status, stating: "Parents or caregivers who believe their child has been denied health care, including gender affirming care, on the basis of that child's gender identity, may file a complaint with OCR."

In August 2022, Florida, citing state-issued guidance against gender affirming care ("widely debunked", according to the UK's Independent), began a rule change process to institute bans on social transition and gender-affirming healthcare for trans youth and a requirement for any adult seeking gender-affirming care to receive approval from the Florida Board of Medicine at least 24 hours in advance.

On October 28, 2022, Florida's Board of Medicine passed a motion to ban all gender-affirming healthcare for minors, including puberty blockers, hormones, and surgeries. The motion mandates all transgender youth to detransition until they turn 18. At one point during the hearing, in response to one protester yelling that trans children would be harmed as a result, board member Dr. Zachariah P. Zachariah answered "That's okay", before voting on the issue. Some who had been at the meeting said that the board had put all the speakers in favor of the ban, many of whom were from outside of the state or outside of the country, first in line to speak, before cutting off public comment once they ran out and pro-trans Floridians began speaking at the meeting. Some protesters staged a die-in where the meeting was held. On October 31, 2022, the Florida Medical Board implemented the new rule that requiring a 24 hour waiting period for adults before they can undergo sexual reassignment surgery and to ban minors from any gender-affirming healthcare. On November 4, 2022, the new rule was approved by the Florida Board of Medicine. On the same day, the state Board of Osteopathic Medicine approved a similar rule, but theirs contained an exemption to allow gender-affirming care for children enrolled in research studies. 

DeSantis and other Republicans have characterized gender-affirming care "as medically unproven and potentially dangerous in the long term, [and] as another political battle against liberal ideologies." Many medical groups, doctors, and mental health specialists have said that treatment for transgender youth is safe and effective, although there is a lack of long-term research on gender-affirming care.

Adult

In August 2022, the state of Florida voted to require any trans adult seeking gender affirming healthcare care to receive approval from the Florida Board of Medicine at least 24 hours in advance.

In January 2023, the DeSantis administration issued an executive memorandum requiring all of Florida's public universities to provide numbers on how many adults they provided with gender affirming medical care, the types of care provided, the names of facilities used, and the number and ages of individuals prescribed various specific treatments.

State Medicaid 
In June 2022, the Florida Agency for Healthcare Administration (AHCA), the agency responsible for overseeing the state's Medicaid service, released a report declaring transgender hormone therapy "experimental and investigational". The AHCA did not reveal its communications with health experts that led to its report.

The report was criticized by a group of scientists, including four from Yale University, who called the report unscientific, flawed, and politically motivated, finding that the report ignored accepted scientific studies and consensus regarding gender dysphoria, had its writers chosen from those with ties to anti-LGBTQ groups specifically for their bias, cited sources with no scientific merit - including a student blog post and a letter to the editor, and that if the state used the same standard it used in the report to evaluate other treatments, it would no longer allow Medicaid to pay for drugs that lower cholesterol. The response to the report also stated that "medical treatment for gender dysphoria does meet generally accepted professional medical standards and is not experimental or investigational".

Effective from August 21, 2022, state Medicaid regulations ban coverage of sexual reassignment surgery, hormone replacement therapy, puberty blockers and "any other transgender healthcare initiatives" for all individuals, regardless of age. This rule affects an estimated 9,000 transgender Floridians. While the legality of the regulation is being heard in court, the regulation can be enforced. The judge ordered the AHCA to turn over its communications with health experts by February 14, 2023.

Education

Parental Rights in Education Act 

In March 2022, the Florida Legislature passed the Parental Rights in Education Act, often referred to as the "Don't Say Gay" bill by its opponents. Governor of Florida Ron DeSantis signed the bill into law on March 28, 2022 - effective from July 1. The law prohibits classroom instruction on sexual orientation or gender identity from kindergarten to grade 3 in Florida public school districts, or instruction on sexual orientation or gender identity in a manner that is not "age appropriate or developmentally appropriate for students" in any grade. The preamble of the law also mentions "classroom discussion" of these topics, dividing legal scholars if that would be included within the scope of the law. It also allows parents and teachers to sue any school district if they believe this policy is violated, with school districts covering the cost of the lawsuit. The law additionally prevents school districts from withholding information about a child's "mental, emotional, or physical well-being" from their parents unless educators believe there is a risk of "abuse, abandonment, or neglect." It additionally requires schools to create a procedure for parents to opt-out of counseling and physical health services for their children offered by the school. Schools must also seek the permission of parents before administering mental-health screeners to children from kindergarten to grade 3. Due to the "Don't Say Gay" nickname, some commentators and social media users thought the bill banned mentioning the word "gay" in school classrooms, though the bill does not actually mention the word "gay" or explicitly prohibit its use.  

A University of Florida poll showed voters are divided – 49 percent strongly or somewhat disapproved of the legislation and 40 percent strongly or somewhat approved. In contrast, a Public Opinion Strategies poll found that 61 percent support the legislation while 26 percent oppose it; 70 percent of parents support the legislation while 24 percent oppose it; and 51 percent of Democrats support the legislation while 29 percent oppose it. Supporters of the bill state that discussions about sexuality and gender identity should be handled by a child's parents and not by their schools; DeSantis' Press Secretary Christina Pushaw has called HB 1557 an "Anti-Grooming Bill". Opponents of the bill state that it could further stigmatize LGBT students and that schools should be a place where LGBT topics are discussed. Some conservatives, such as political commentator Matt Walsh, argue that the bill does not go far enough. There are concerns among some legal scholars that the proposed legislation within Florida could violate the First Amendment to the United States Constitution, and could be potentially unconstitutional. Walkouts by students were held in schools across Florida in response to the bill. The bill has the potential to negatively affect the $97 billion tourism industries within Florida.

Employees at The Walt Disney Company also planned walkouts over the bill, which culminated in a large protest. After DeSantis signed the bill, Disney released a statement that its goal is for the law to be repealed or struck down. Disney also paused their contributions to Florida political campaigns as they assessed their "approach to advocacy, including political giving in Florida." Prompted by Desantis, the Florida Legislature passed a bill in April that could limit Disney's ability to self-govern and impose tax penalties; the move was considered by many to be retaliation to Disney's actions following HB 1557's passage.

On March 31, a lawsuit was filed in federal court on behalf of Equality Florida and Family Equality, which sought to block the bill on the grounds that it was unconstitutional. The lawsuit alleged that the bill violates the constitutionally protected rights of free speech, equal protection and due process of students and families, and argued that the bill was an effort to "control young minds" which prevented students from living "their true identities in school". In October 2022, a federal judge dismissed and rejected the challenge to the legislation effective since July 1.

The Human Rights Campaign and the Center for Countering Digital Hate recorded a 406 percent increase in the use of tweets associating the LGBTQ community with being "groomers", "pedophiles", and "predators" following the passage of the law.

AP African American studies 

On January 12, 2023, the Florida Department of Education's Office of Articulation, under the administration of Republican governor Ron DeSantis, sent a letter to College Board saying the course was "inexplicably contrary to Florida law and significantly lacks educational value." The letter reportedly did not specify what was objectionable to the department, but a spokesperson for DeSantis indicated that the course left "large, ambiguous gaps that can be filled with additional ideological material." According to The New York Times, the letter called the course "historically inaccurate" and a violation of Florida state law.

DeSantis later gave his reason for the ban as the inclusion of queer theory and intersectionality in the course, as well as content regarding the role prisons play in systemic oppression, stating that these topics were on "the wrong side of the line for Florida standards".

In response, College Board said that it would revise the course nationwide, but did not give specifics on how. The decision was praised by the Florida DoE, who called for College Board to remove "content on Critical Race Theory, Black Queer Studies, Intersectionality and other topics that violate our laws".

The updated version of the course was later released, with the names of numerous black writers associated with black feminism, critical race theory, and the queer experience being stripped from the course, the black lives matter movement removed from the formal curriculum, and "black conservatism" added as a suggested research topic.

Book bans 

In March 2022, Florida passed a law to create a list of sanctioned reading material for students in educational settings, punishing any teacher or school librarian whose classrooms or libraries contain unsanctioned books with felony charges. Sanctioned books must be reviewed by the state to be free of "prohibited material harmful to minors", which critics have said that under Florida state law includes content regarding the LGBT community and black history.

Gay and trans panic defense
The gay and trans panic defense remains legal in Florida. In March 2021, a bill to repeal it passed the Criminal Justice committee in the Senate by a vote of 6–2. The bill died in the Judiciary committee. The gay panic defense is a legal strategy in which defendants accused of violent offenses claim that unwanted same-sex sexual advances provoked them into reacting by way of self-defense.

Conversion therapy

On September 3, 2015, State Representative David Richardson filed a bill to ban the use of conversion therapy on LGBT minors. The bill was introduced to the Florida Legislature on January 12, 2016. However, it died in a House subcommittee on March 11, 2016. A similar bill died in 2017.

Since July 2016, the Florida Department of Children and Families has prohibited facility staff from attempting to change or discourage a child's sexual orientation, gender identity or gender expression.

According to an Orlando Political Observer-Gravis Marketing poll conducted in April 2017, 71 percent of Floridians supported banning conversion therapy for minors, 11 percent were against banning it and 18 percent were uncertain.

Local bans
As of February 2020, several cities and counties in Florida have passed their own bans on conversion therapy on minors, namely Miami Beach, Wilton Manors, Miami, North Bay Village, West Palm Beach, Bay Harbor Islands, Lake Worth, El Portal, Key West, Boynton Beach, Tampa, Delray Beach, Riviera Beach, Wellington, Greenacres, Boca Raton, Oakland Park, Palm Beach County, Gainesville, Broward County, Alachua County, Fort Lauderdale, and Tallahassee. Conversion therapy bans have also been proposed or pending in other cities, for example in Sarasota, and St. Petersburg.

On January 31, 2019, a federal judge granted a temporary injunction against part of the Tampa ordinance. The judge stopped the city from enforcing its ban on talk therapy, while a lawsuit, Vazzo v. City of Tampa, was allowed to proceed. Other forms of therapy, such as electroshock therapy, are still explicitly banned. The city filed a motion to dismiss.

In November 2020, the 11th Circuit Court of Appeals voted 2–1 to declare ordinances banning conversion therapy on minors in Boca Raton and surrounding Palm Beach County a violation of the First Amendment of the Constitution. The American Academy of Pediatrics and the American Psychiatric Association are fully opposed to this pseudoscientific practice. This decision caused a circuit split; the Third Circuit and Ninth Circuit courts of appeals have upheld conversion therapy bans as constitutional.

Living conditions

Faced initially with high homophobia, LGBT groups began slowly to raise awareness of their cause and movement. Several organizations and associations were established over the years, including SAVE Dade in 1993, The Pride Center at Equality Park in 1993 and Equality Florida in 1997, among others. 

The Miami metropolitan area is famous internationally for its LGBT culture, scene and nightlife, with numerous bars, clubs, cafés and events catering to the LGBT community, leading Miami to be called a "gay mecca". The cities of Miami Beach (especially the neighborhood of South Beach) and Wilton Manors particularly are often referred to as gay villages. As is Key West, which elected one of the first openly gay mayors in the country; Richard A. Heyman served as mayor from 1983 to 1985 and again from 1987 to 1989. There is also a fairly large LGBT community in Fort Lauderdale. LGBT events include Miami Beach Pride, which drew an estimated 150,000 participants and spectators in 2019, PrideFest Key West, the OutShine Film Festival, Pride Fort Lauderdale and Palm Beach Pride, held annually in late March in Lake Worth, among others. Outside of Southern Florida, events include Come Out with Pride in Orlando, St. Pete Pride in St. Petersburg, the Tampa International Gay and Lesbian Film Festival, River City Pride in Jacksonville, Gay Days at Walt Disney World, Memorial Day Pensacola Beach Pride, and Tallahassee Pridefest.

On June 12, 2016, a shooting occurred at an Orlando gay nightclub, Pulse, the deadliest incident in the history of violence against LGBT people in the United States. However, media reported that the shooting resulted in no legislative advances in LGBT rights, with the Republican Party continuing to oppose legislation which would protect LGBT people from discrimination. In June 2021, the Governor of Florida vetoed an "item-lined budget bill" - that legally provides mental health, counseling and compensation, directly towards victims of the June 2016 Pulse nightclub Orlando shootings within Florida. That month, the US Congress passed, and Biden signed, a law creating a national memorial at the site of the shooting.

Public opinion
A 2017 Public Religion Research Institute (PRRI) poll found that 61 percent of Florida residents supported same-sex marriage, while 30 percent were opposed; nine percent were undecided. Additionally, 71 percent supported an anti-discrimination law covering sexual orientation and gender identity; twenty-two percent were against. The PRRI also found that 62 percent were against allowing public businesses to refuse to serve LGBT people due to religious beliefs, while 31 percent supported such religiously-based refusals.

Summary table

See also

 Law of Florida
 LGBT culture in Miami
 LGBT history in Florida
 LGBT rights in the United States
 Politics of Florida
 SAVE Dade
 Florida Legislative Investigation Committee, also called the Johns Committee, which tried to eliminate homosexuals from universities and state employment in Florida, 1956–1965
 Homosexuality and Citizenship in Florida, anti-gay pamphlet published by the Johns Committee in 1964, notorious at the time because of its lewd photographs of men engaged in sexual activity
Palm Beach County Human Rights Council

Notes

References

Further reading 
 
  FAQs in PDF format

LGBT rights in Florida